One for Sorrow may refer to:
 "One for Sorrow" (nursery rhyme), a traditional children's nursery rhyme
 "One for Sorrow" (song), a 1998 song by British pop group Steps
 One for Sorrow (1999 novel) by Mary Reed/Eric Mayer - first in the John, the Lord Chamberlain series of historical mysteries
 One for Sorrow (novel), a 2007 novel written by American writer Christopher Barzak
 One for Sorrow (album), a 2011 album by melodic death metal band Insomnium
 "One for Sorrow", a song by American singer/songwriter Jeffrey Foucault from the album Ghost Repeater